Phasmahyla cochranae, sometimes called the chocolatefoot leaf frog, is a species of frog in the subfamily Phyllomedusinae. It is endemic to Brazil. Its natural habitats are subtropical or tropical moist lowland forests, subtropical or tropical moist montane forests, and rivers. It is threatened by habitat loss.

Etymology
The specific name cochranae honours Doris Mable Cochran, an American herpetologist.

References

Phasmahyla
Endemic fauna of Brazil
Amphibians of Brazil
Amphibians described in 1966
Taxonomy articles created by Polbot